Oche (/ˈɒki/) is a throw line in the game of darts. Oche may also refer to:
Château d'Oche (mountain), a mountain in France
Château d'Oche (Saint-Priest-les-Fougères), a manor house in France
Dent d'Oche, a mountain in France
Oches, a commune in northern France
Ochi (mountain) in Greece
óchi, transliteration of όχι (pronounced similar to "ohi"), "no" in the Greek language
O'Che 1867, a family-owned goldsmith and jewellery business in Macau, China
Uche Sherif (or Oche Sherif), Nigerian football player

See also
Aachen